Roshan Kumar Rao (born 28 December 1993) is an Indian cricketer. He made his List A debut for Odisha in the 2017–18 Vijay Hazare Trophy on 8 February 2018. He made his first-class debut for Odisha in the 2018–19 Ranji Trophy on 14 December 2018.

References

External links
 

1993 births
Living people
Indian cricketers
Odisha cricketers
People from Nabarangpur district
Cricketers from Odisha